Barnie is a surname and nickname.  Notable people with the name include:

 Billy Barnie (1853–1900), American Major League Baseball manager and catcher
 John Barnhill (American football) (1903-1973), American college football player, coach and athletics administrator
 Abraham Barnie Boonzaaier (born 1992), South African rugby union player

See also
 
 
 Barney (disambiguation)
 Barnier

Lists of people by nickname
Nicknames